John Warwick Swinburne (born 4 December 1939) is a former English cricketer. Swinburne was a right-handed batsman who bowled right-arm off break. He was born in Wath-upon-Dearne, Yorkshire and educated at Wath Grammar School and Leeds University.

Swinburne first played county cricket for Devon, making his debut for the county in the 1964 Minor Counties Championship against Berkshire. He continued to play Minor counties cricket for Devon until 1969, in which time he made 46 appearances for the county. Swinburne joined Northamptonshire in 1970, making his first-class debut in the County Championship against Warwickshire. He played first-class cricket for Northamptonshire from 1970 to 1974, making 29 first-class appearances. A tailend batsman, Swinburne scored 159 runs in first-class cricket at a batting average of just 5.67. His position within the team was that of a bowler. He took 83 wickets for Northamptonshire at a bowling average of 27.48, with four five wicket hauls and one ten wicket haul in a match. His best innings bowling figures came against Warwickshire in 1971, with Swinburne taking figures of 6/57 to guide Northamptonshire to a close 46 run win.

It was also for Northamptonshire that he made his debut in List A cricket, in the 1971 John Player League against Middlesex. In this match he bowled 4 wicket-less overs in what was his only List A appearance for the county. Following the end of his first-class career at the end of the 1974 season, he joined Shropshire for the 1975 season, for whom he played 20 Minor Counties Championship matches till 1977, while playing at club level for Old Hill. He played his second and final List A match for Shropshire in the 1976 Gillette Cup against Yorkshire. In this match Swinburne scored 16 runs before being dismissed by Geoff Cope, and with the ball he bowled 10 overs, but once again went wicket-less.

References

External links
John Swinburne at ESPNcricinfo

1939 births
Living people
Cricketers from Rotherham
English cricketers
Devon cricketers
Northamptonshire cricketers
Shropshire cricketers
English cricketers of 1946 to 1968
English cricketers of 1969 to 2000